Midsummer Madness is a 2007 film telling 6 different stories all taking place in Latvia during the Latvian national festivities of Jāņi. One of the stories shows a French woman (played by Maria de Medeiros) who brings the ashes of her late husband to Latvia, believing it to be the same country as Lithuania as she wants to spread her husband's ashes near the Hill of Crosses, which is in Lithuania. She eventually gets to the hill of crosses and this shows the only part of the film outside of Latvia.

Cast
 Orlando Wells – Curt (later Kurts)
 Gundars Āboliņš – Oskars
 Maria de Medeiros – Livia
 Dominique Pinon - Toni 
 Chulpan Khamatova – Aida
 Tobias Moretti – Pēteris
 Victor McGuire – Mike
 Detlev Buck – Axel
 Roland Düringer – Karl
 Birgit Minichmayr – Maja
 Daniil Spivakovskiy – Foma
 Aurelija Anužytė – Natasha
 Dainis Porgants – Purviņš
 Yevgeni Sitokhin – Leonid
 Imbi Strenga – Mārīte
 James-William Watts – Lewis
 Benito Sambo – Yuki

External links
 

Latvian-language films
English-language Latvian films